Wyoming Highway 258 (WYO 258) is a  state highway in Wyoming, known as Wyoming Boulevard and acts as a two-lane bypass around the western, southern, and eastern sides of the City of Casper.

Route description
Wyoming Highway 258 begins its western end at US 20 Business/US 26 Business (Yellowstone Highway) in Mills and from there travels counter-clockwise around Casper. WYO 258 heads south and crosses the North Platte River before intersecting W. 13th Street, which also provides access to Fort Casper. Continuing south, WYO 258 passes along the western side of the Central Wyoming Fair Grounds and briefly parallels the North Platte River a short distance before intersecting Wyoming Highway 220 (CY Avenue), the main artery for traffic coming into Casper from the west. Past WYO 220, Highway 258 gradually turns eastward before reaching the southern terminus of Wyoming Highway 252 (S. Poplar Street). Under 1 mile later, Wyoming Highway 251 (Casper Mountain Road) is intersected which travels to Casper College and Casper Mountain. Highway 258 continues east for a small distance and then begins to turn northeast as it travels around the southeastern outskirts of Casper and passes west of the Casper County Club. Now mainly directed north, WYO 258 travels through the eastern neighborhoods of Casper and intersects busy east-west 2nd Street. Casper's Eastridge Mall lies on the southeastern side of this intersection. A third of mile north of that intersection, Interstate 25 is intersected at exit 185 as WYO 258 enters the Town of Evansville. Just past the interstate, WYO 258 reaches its eastern end at US 20/US 26/US 87 (Yellowstone Highway) after . The roadway itself continues north as Curtis Avenue north through Evansville.

Wyoming Highway 258 is maintained by the City of Casper, however when Highway 258 momentarily travels out of the city, state maintenance will begin and end as it does southeast of the city. Casper has taken over maintenance of the portions of the route within its city limits, but for signage purposes the route is still Highway 258.

Major intersections

References

Official 2003 State Highway Map of Wyoming

External links 

Wyoming State Routes 200-299
WYO 258 - US 20/US 26/US 87 to I-25
WYO 258 - I-25 to WYO 251
WYO 258 - WYO 251 to WYO 252
WYO 258 - WYO 252 to WYO 220
WYO 258 - WYO 220 to US 20 BUS/US 26 BUS
Casper, WY website
Fort Casper
Central Wyoming Fair & Rodeo

Casper, Wyoming
Transportation in Natrona County, Wyoming
258